The Flame's Daughter (Chinese: 烈火如歌) is a 2018 Chinese television series based on the novel of the same name by Ming Xiaoxi. It stars Dilraba Dilmurat, Vic Chou, Vin Zhang and Liu Ruilin in leading roles. The series premiered on Youku on March 1, 2018.

Synopsis
In ancient times, Anhe Palace was in a position of placing the country into jeopardy. The owner of the palace, An Ye Luo, was in love with his senior An Ye Ming, but An Ye Ming married a wandering warrior named Zhan Feitian and birthed a daughter with him. In order to protect her daughter from An Ye Luo's grasp, Lie Mingjing, Zhan Feitian's sworn brother, swapped his son Zhan Feng with her.

After Zhan Feitian's death, Lie Mingjing named the girl Lie Ruge and took custody of Zhan Feitian's son, Zhan Feng. Lie Ruge grew up with her seniors, Zhan Feng and Yu Zihan. Lie Ruge and Zhan Feng both fell in love but An Ye Luo, seeing Liehuo Pavilion growing in strength and power, tricked Zhan Feng into believing that Lie Mingjing killed his father. This resulted in Zhan Feng breaking up with Lie Ruge, who eventually became acquainted with Yin Xue, somebody who grew to protect her.

Over time, An Ye Luo managed to coerce Zhan Feng into killing his biological father, Lie Mingjing. When Zhan Feng hesitated to do so, Lie Mingjing's adoptive son killed Lie Mingjing (who did so to please An Ye Luo). Eventually, Zhan Feng learned the truth about his birth and decided to get revenge on An Ye Luo. Together with Lie Ruge, Yu Zihan, and Yin Xue, they were able to defeat An Ye Luo and restore peace to the nation.

Cast

Main

Supporting

Liehuo Pavilion and associates

Anhe Palace

Wu Dao City

Pili Sect

Pin Hua brothel

People at the palace

Others

Production
The series is produced by the same team behind the 2017 hit drama Eternal Love, which consists of Gao Shen as its producer, Zhang Shuping as style director and Chen Haozhong as artistic director. Director Liang Shengquan is known for his works in Swords of Legends and The Mystic Nine; while screenwriter Mobao Feibao is known for her success adaptations of popular IPs like Scarlet Heart and My Sunshine. Costume designer Ru Meiqi and makeup director Su Yongzhi; who worked on Nirvana in Fire and All Quiet in Peking also joined the team.

Filming began on 30 March 2017 at Xiangshan Movie & Television Town, and wrapped up on 26 July 2017.

Soundtrack

Awards and nominations

International broadcast
  - 8TV (Malaysia) 12 April 2018 - 25 June 2018, 19:00–20:00, Monday to Friday
  - GMA Network January 28, 2019,-March 22, 2019 08:50-09:20, Monday to Friday
  - Channel 3 January 7, 2023-, 02:50-04:00, Everyday

References

Chinese wuxia television series
Television shows based on Chinese novels
2018 Chinese television series debuts
Youku original programming
Chinese web series
Television series by Jay Walk Studio
Television series by SMG Pictures
Television series by Perfect World Pictures
Chinese fantasy television series
2018 Chinese television series endings
2018 web series debuts